Shore Acres or Shoreacres may refer to:

Places

Canada
 Shoreacres, British Columbia, an unincorporated community
 Shoreacres, Ontario

United States
 Shore Acres, California, an unincorporated community
 Shore Acres (Lamoine Beach, Maine), a historic home
 Shore Acres (Madison County, New York) , a mansion near Cazenovia Lake, New York
 Shore Acres, Monroe County, New York, a hamlet in the town of Hamlin, New York
 Shore Acres, Staten Island, New York
 Shore Acres State Park, in Oregon
 Shoreacres, Texas, a city

Other uses
 Shore Acres (play), a 1893 play by James A. Herne
 Shore Acres (1914 film), a silent film directed by John H. Pratt
 Shore Acres (1920 film), an American silent film